Afzal al-Din Kermani was a Persian historian, author, poet, philosopher, and physician in the early 12th and early 13th centuries. He wrote the books Aghd Al ala Lel Moghefe Al ahla and Badayeh o Zaman Fi Vaghayeh Kerman about the geography and history of Kerman.

Sources
 

12th-century Iranian philosophers
Date of birth unknown
Date of death unknown
Place of birth unknown
Place of death unknown
13th-century Iranian philosophers
Poets from the Seljuk Empire
Scholars from the Seljuk Empire